Tom Young may refer to:
Tom Young (basketball) (1932–2022), American college basketball coach
Tom Young (cricketer) (1890–1936), English cricketer
Tom Young (American football) (1907–1973), American college football coach in the 1940s and 1950s
Tom Young (Australian footballer) (born 1992), Australian rules footballer
Tom Young (novelist) (born 1962), American novelist
Tom Young (trade unionist) (1870–1953), New Zealand seaman and trade unionist
Tom Young (baseball) (1902–?), Negro leagues utility player

See also
Thomas Young (disambiguation)
Tommy Young (born 1947), professional wrestling referee and retired professional wrestler
Tommy Young (footballer) (born 1947), Scottish footballer
Tom Youngs (disambiguation)